A local area network (LAN) is a computer network that interconnects computers within a limited area such as a residence, school, laboratory, university campus or office building. By contrast, a wide area network (WAN) not only covers a larger geographic distance, but also generally involves leased telecommunication circuits.

Ethernet and Wi-Fi are the two most common technologies in use for local area networks. Historical network technologies include ARCNET, Token Ring and AppleTalk.

History
The increasing demand and usage of computers in universities and research labs in the late 1960s generated the need to provide high-speed interconnections between computer systems. A 1970 report from the Lawrence Radiation Laboratory detailing the growth of their "Octopus" network gave a good indication of the situation.

A number of experimental and early commercial LAN technologies were developed in the 1970s. Ethernet was developed at Xerox PARC between 1973 and 1974. Cambridge Ring was developed at Cambridge University starting in 1974.  ARCNET was developed by Datapoint Corporation in 1976 and announced in 1977. It had the first commercial installation in December 1977 at Chase Manhattan Bank in New York. In 1979, the Electronic voting systems for the European Parliament was the first installation of a LAN connecting hundreds (420) of microprocessor-controlled voting terminals to a polling/selecting central unit with a multidrop bus with Master/slave (technology) arbitration.

The development and proliferation of personal computers using the CP/M operating system in the late 1970s, and later DOS-based systems starting in 1981, meant that many sites grew to dozens or even hundreds of computers. The initial driving force for networking was to share storage and printers, both of which were expensive at the time. There was much enthusiasm for the concept, and for several years, from about 1983 onward, computer industry pundits habitually declared the coming year to be, "The year of the LAN".

In practice, the concept was marred by the proliferation of incompatible physical layer and network protocol implementations, and a plethora of methods of sharing resources. Typically, each vendor would have its own type of network card, cabling, protocol, and network operating system. A solution appeared with the advent of Novell NetWare which provided even-handed support for dozens of competing card and cable types, and a much more sophisticated operating system than most of its competitors.

Of the competitors to NetWare, only Banyan Vines had comparable technical strengths, but Banyan never gained a secure base. 3Com produced 3+Share and Microsoft produced MS-Net. These then formed the basis for collaboration between Microsoft and 3Com to create a simple network operating system LAN Manager and its cousin, IBM's LAN Server. None of these enjoyed any lasting success; Netware dominated the personal computer LAN business from early after its introduction in 1983 until the mid-1990s when Microsoft introduced Windows NT.

In 1983, TCP/IP was first shown capable of supporting actual defense department applications on a Defense Communication Agency LAN testbed located at Reston, Virginia. The TCP/IP-based LAN successfully supported Telnet, FTP, and a Defense Department teleconferencing application. This demonstrated the feasibility of employing TCP/IP LANs to interconnect Worldwide Military Command and Control System (WWMCCS) computers at command centers throughout the United States. However, WWMCCS was superseded by the Global Command and Control System (GCCS) before that could happen.

During the same period, Unix workstations were using TCP/IP networking. Although the workstation market segment is now much reduced, the technologies developed in the area continue to be influential on the Internet and in all forms of networking—and the TCP/IP protocol has replaced IPX, AppleTalk, NBF, and other protocols used by the early PC LANs.

Cabling

In 1979, the Electronic voting systems for the European Parliament was using 10 kilometers of simple unshielded twisted pair category 3 cable—the same cable used for telephone systems—installed inside the benches of the European Parliament  Hemicycles in Strasbourg and Luxembourg.

Early Ethernet (10BASE-5 and 10BASE-2) used coaxial cable. Shielded twisted pair was used in IBM's Token Ring LAN implementation. In 1984, StarLAN showed the potential of simple unshielded twisted pair by using category 3 cable—the same cable used for telephone systems. This led to the development of 10BASE-T (and its twisted-pair successors) and structured cabling which is still the basis of most commercial LANs today.

While optical fiber cable is common for links between network switches, use of fiber to the desktop is rare.

Wireless media
In a wireless LAN, users have unrestricted movement within the coverage area. Wireless networks have become popular in residences and small businesses, because of their ease of installation. Most wireless LANs use Wi-Fi as wireless adapters are typically integrated into smartphones, tablet computers and laptops. Guests are often offered Internet access via a hotspot service.

Technical aspects
Network topology describes the layout of interconnections between devices and network segments. At the data link layer and physical layer, a wide variety of LAN topologies have been used, including ring, bus, mesh and star.

Simple LANs generally consist of cabling and one or more switches.  A switch can be connected to a router, cable modem, or ADSL modem for Internet access. A LAN can include a wide variety of other network devices such as firewalls, load balancers, and network intrusion detection. Advanced LANs are characterized by their use of redundant links with switches using the spanning tree protocol to prevent loops, their ability to manage differing traffic types via quality of service (QoS), and their ability to segregate traffic with VLANs.

At the higher network layers, protocols such as NetBIOS, IPX/SPX, AppleTalk and others were once common, but the Internet protocol suite (TCP/IP) has prevailed as the standard of choice.

LANs can maintain connections with other LANs via leased lines, leased services, or across the Internet using virtual private network technologies. Depending on how the connections are established and secured, and the distance involved, such linked LANs may also be classified as a metropolitan area network (MAN) or a wide area network (WAN).

See also
 LAN messenger
 LAN party
 Network interface controller

References

External links 
 

 
Office equipment